The knockout stage of the 1970 FIFA World Cup was the second and final stage of the competition, following the group stage. It featured the eight national teams that had finished in the top two in each of the four groups, and so advanced to compete in a single-elimination style tournament. A third place play-off was contested between the two losing semi-finalists.

In the knockout stage (including the final), if a match was level at the end of 90 minutes, extra time of two periods (15 minutes each) would be played. If the score was still level after extra time prior to the final, then a coin toss by the referee would determine the winner. If the final was still level after 120 minutes then the match would be replayed at a later date.

The stage began on 14 June with the quarter-finals, and ended one week later with the final match of the tournament held at the Estadio Azteca in Mexico City, in which Brazil defeated Italy 4–1 to claim a then-record third World Cup triumph.

All times listed are local (UTC−6)

Qualified teams
The top two placed teams from each of the four groups qualified for the knockout stage.

Bracket

Quarter-finals

Soviet Union vs Uruguay

Italy vs Mexico

Brazil vs Peru

West Germany vs England

Semi-finals

Uruguay vs Brazil

Italy vs West Germany

Third place play-off

Final

References

Knockout stage
1970
Peru at the 1970 FIFA World Cup
knock
Knock
Soviet Union at the 1970 FIFA World Cup
knock
knock
knock
Mexico at the 1970 FIFA World Cup
1970